Tout est calme (All Is Calm) is a collaboration mini album by Yann Tiersen, The Married Monk, Claire Pichet, and Olivier Mellano.  The album was recorded at Studio Le Chalet in Bordeaux, except for "L'Étal", which was recorded and mixed in Cancale, and then mastered at the Electric City studio in Brussels.  It was released through Ici, d'ailleurs... on 29 March 1999.  The mini collaboration album peaked at number 45 on the French Albums Chart

Track listing
All songs were written and composed by Yann Tiersen.  The Married Monk collaborated on all pieces except "La Relève" and "L'Étal".  Yann Tiersen sings on "Les Grandes Marées", "Tout est calme", "La Relève", and "La Terrasse".

Personnel

Musicians
 Yann Tiersen - vocals, guitar, mandolin, violin, viola, cello, banjo, piano, toy piano, organ, bass, melodica, vibraphone, bells, percussion, Leslie speaker
 The Married Monk
 Christian Quermalet - guitar, banjo, piano, organ, drums, percussion
 Fabio Viscogliosi - guitar, mandolin, electric piano, organ, percussion
 Philippe Lebruman - bass, guitar, piano, electric piano, organ, melodica, vibraphone, percussion
 Jean-Michel Pirès - drums, percussion
 Claire Pichet - vocals on "La Rupture" 
 Olivier Mellano - guitar on "La Crise" and "La Pharmacie" 

Production
 Dominique Brusson – engineer
 Fabrice Tizon – engineer
 Yann Tiersen – mixing
 Uwe Teichert – mastering
 Frank Loriou – artwork
 Philippe Lebruman – photography

Charts

References

1999 albums
Yann Tiersen albums